Novafeltria is a comune (municipality) in the Province of Rimini in the Italian region Emilia-Romagna.

Geography
It is the main center of the Montefeltro traditional region. It is located on the Marecchia river.

History
Until 1941 it was known as Mercatino Marecchia. The current Town Hall was the 17th century residence of Counts of Segni from Bologna.

After the referendum of 17 and 18 December 2006, Novafeltria was detached from the Province of Pesaro and Urbino (Marche) to join Emilia-Romagna and the Province of Rimini on 15 August 2009.

People
Ivan Graziani, Italian singer-songwriter

References

External links
 Official website

Cities and towns in Emilia-Romagna